Estella Dawn Warren (born December 23, 1978) is a Canadian actress, fashion model and former synchronized swimmer. During her swimming career she was a member of the Canada national team and won three national titles. Since 1994, she has been modeling through publications; such as Sports Illustrated as well as working for campaigns for such brands as Perry Ellis and Victoria's Secret.

Warren later began a career as an actress, starring in such films as Tim Burton's 2001 re-adapted film Planet of the Apes as well as television roles in Law & Order, Law & Order: Special Victims Unit, and Beauty and the Beast.

Early life
Estella Warren was born in Peterborough, Ontario, Canada, to Esther, an elementary school headmistress, and Don Warren, a used-car dealer. She is the youngest of three daughters.

Career

Synchronized swimming
In 1990, Warren moved to Toronto to train with the national synchronized swimming team. In 1995, after becoming the senior national champion, Warren had the chance to move on to the 1996 Summer Olympics. She is a three-time Canada national team champion and the solo bronze medalist at the 1995 Junior World Championships.

Fashion modeling
Estella Warren was discovered by Rhonda Broadbelt Fonte, the owner of Broadbelt & Fonte Models, in 1994 when she was a synchronized swimmer living in Ontario. Broadbelt Fonte then introduced Warren to George Gallier, the owner of American Models. She then went to New York City to shoot some photo tests. During that time, Gallier introduced her to fashion photographer Ellen Von Unwerth, who immediately saw Estella's beautifully unique looks and booked her for a photo shoot for Italian Vogue.

Her international modelling career and recognition worldwide was assured after she shot the Cacharel fragrance campaign "Eau d'Eden" with French photographer director Jean-Paul Goude. The Chanel No. 5 campaign with director Luc Besson followed; both campaigns happened while she was managed by George Gallier.

Warren has appeared on the cover of Vogue, Vanity Fair, Elle, Cosmopolitan, and in two television commercials for Chanel No. 5 perfume. Warren was ranked Number 1 on Maxim's Hot 100 List in 2000 when she was 21. She was ranked Number 52 in FHM's "100 Sexiest Women in the World 2006" special supplement and was the November 2007 entry in Stuff magazine's pinup calendar.

Warren also has appeared in campaigns for UGG Australia, Andrew Marc, Perry Ellis, Nine West, Cartier, Volvo, De Beers, and Cacharel, as well as in television advertisements for Samsung. Additionally, she has modeled for Victoria's Secret and hosted the television special for the Sports Illustrated Swimsuit Issue.

She appeared on the cover in the nude for the third issue of the 3D magazine World's Most Beautiful, which came out in June 2013.

Acting

Warren's films include Driven (2001), Planet of the Apes (2001), Kangaroo Jack (2003), The Cooler (2003), Stranger Within (2013), and Just Within Reach (2017).

Warren appeared in That '70s Show in 2003, as well as a two-part crossover role in Law & Order and Law & Order: Special Victims Unit, in September 2005. She also appeared in an episode of Ghost Whisperer in 2005.

Warren has appeared in music videos for INXS's "Afterglow", Blank & Jones' "Beyond Time" and Dr. Dre's "I Need a Doctor". She also appeared in the film Just Within Reach with Lenny Von Dohlen, Alex Cubis, Tami Romen and Thomas Duffy.

Arrests
On May 24, 2011, Warren was arrested in Los Angeles after she allegedly hit three parked cars with her Toyota Prius and then fled the scene. Police eventually found her and arrested her for driving under the influence of alcohol (DUI). During her arrest she allegedly kicked an officer and resisted being handcuffed. Later, at the police station where her arrest was being booked, she managed to slip her cuffs and run but was quickly recaptured. Ultimately she was charged with DUI, hit-and-run, battery on a police officer and resisting a police officer. Her bail was set at $100,000. On August 19, 2011, Warren entered a no contest plea to the drunken driving charge and the other charges were dropped; she was ordered to a residential rehab facility for four months.

The Los Angeles County Sheriff's Department recorded Warren's date of birth as December 23, 1970.  Although Warren's 1978 birth year is well-established, some news sources then reported that she was born in 1970 or cited her age as if she were born that year.

In 2017, Warren was arrested for domestic violence after allegedly throwing cleaning fluid at her boyfriend.

Filmography

Film

Television

References

External links

1978 births
21st-century Canadian actresses
Actresses from Ontario
Female models from Ontario
Canadian film actresses
Canadian television actresses
Canadian synchronized swimmers
Living people
Sportspeople from Peterborough, Ontario